The Celebes Sea, or Sulawesi Sea, of the western Pacific Ocean is bordered on the north by the Sulu Archipelago and Sulu Sea and Mindanao Island of the Philippines, on the east by the Sangihe Islands chain, on the south by Sulawesi's Minahasa Peninsula, and on the west by northern Kalimantan in Indonesia. South of the Cape Mangkalihat, the sea opens southwest through the Makassar Strait into the Java Sea.

The Celebes Sea is a piece of an ancient ocean basin that formed 42 million years ago in a locale removed from any landmass. By 20 million years ago, earth crust movement had moved the basin close enough to the Indonesian and Philippine volcanoes to receive emitted debris. By 10 million years ago the Celebes Sea was inundated with continental debris, including coal, which was shed from a growing young mountain on Borneo and the basin had docked against Eurasia.

The border between the Celebes and the Sulu Sea is at the Sibutu-Basilan Ridge. Strong ocean currents, deep sea trenches and seamounts, combined with active volcanic islands, result in complex oceanographic features.

Delimitation of the Exclusive Economic Zone boundary
On 23 May 2013, the Government of the Republic of the Philippines and the Government of the Republic of Indonesia signed an agreement to establish the boundary line that delimits the overlapping Exclusive Economic Zone (EEZ) between the two countries. It has been agreed that north of the boundary line will be under the jurisdiction of the Philippines (named as Mindanao Sea) and Indonesia be south of the boundary line (named Celebes Sea).

Extent
The International Hydrographic Organization (IHO) defines the Celebes Sea as being one of the waters of the East Indian Archipelago. The IHO defines its limits as follows:
On the North. The Southern limit of Sulu Sea [From Tagolo Point, down the West coast of Mindanao to the Southwest extremity thence to the North coast of Basilan Island, through this island to its Southern extremity, thence a line to Bitinan Island off the Eastern end of Jolo Island, through Jolo to a point in long. 121°04'E on its South coast, thence through Tapul and Lugus Islands and along the North coast of Tawitawi Island to Bongao Island off its Western end, and from thence to Tanjong Labian, the Northeastern extreme of Borneo] and the Southwest coast of Mindanao.

On the East. A line from Tinaca Point, the Southern point of Mindanao, to the North point of pulau Sangihe Besar thence through the pulau-pulau Sangihe to Tanjung Puisan, the Northeast extreme of Celebes [Sulawesi].

On the South. The North coast of Celebes between tanjung Puisan and tanjung Binar (Cape Rivers) and thence a line to Tanjung Mangkalihat in Borneo, the Northern limit of Makassar Strait [a line joining Tanjung Mangkalihat, Borneo and tanjung Binar (Cape Rivers), Celebes].

On the West. The East coast of Borneo between Tanjung Mangkalihat and Tanjong Labian, the Southern limit of the Sulu Sea.

Marine life 

The Celebes Sea is home to a wide variety of fish and aquatic creatures. The tropical setting and warm clear waters permit it to harbor about 580 of the world's 793 species of reef-building corals, which grow as some of the most bio-diverse coral reefs in the world, and an impressive array of marine life, including whales and dolphins, sea turtles, manta rays, eagle rays, barracuda, marlin and other reef and pelagic species. Tuna and yellowfin tuna are also abundant. 
In addition to high abundance of fish caught in the Celebes sea, this sea also yields other aquatic products like sea tang.

Commercial significance 
The Celebes Sea is an important sea route for regional trade. The sea is also popular for scuba diving and luxury ocean cruising.

Geology 
The Celebes Sea is underlain by an oceanic plate with a mid oceanic spreading in the center part. This plate is subducted to the south and north. A number of seismic surveys and research drillings were done in this area to gather geological information.

See also
Bunaken
Davao Gulf
Maitum, Sarangani
Minahassa Peninsula
Moro Gulf
Sangir Islands
Sarangani Bay
Talaud Islands

References

External links

 Ocean Explorer (www.oceanexplorer.noaa.gov) - Public outreach site for explorations sponsored by the Office of Ocean Exploration.
 Exploring the Inner Space of the Celebes Sea 2007 - A rich collection of images, video and audio podcast.
 NOAA, Ocean Explorer YouTube Channel

 
Marginal seas of the Pacific Ocean
Seas of Indonesia
Seas of the Philippines
Seas of Malaysia
Geography of Mindanao
Landforms of North Sulawesi
Indonesia–Malaysia border
Indonesia–Philippines border
Malaysia–Philippines border
Landforms of Kalimantan
Maritime Southeast Asia